Lamarckia is a Eurasian and African plant in the grass family.

Species
The only known species is Lamarckia aurea, the golden dog's-tail or goldentop grass
 It is an annual plant, typically 30-45 centimetres in height, with clusters of golden flowers in a panicle 5–8 cm long and 2–2.5 cm broad. The species is native to the Mediterranean Basin and neighboring regions from Portugal to the Canary Islands east to Ethiopia and northern India. It is also naturalized in parts of Australia and the Americas, considered an invasive weed in some areas.

Formerly included
see Aegopogon 
Lamarckia tenella - Aegopogon tenellus

References

See also 
Jepson Manual Treatment
Grass Manual Treatment
Photo gallery

Pooideae
Monotypic Poaceae genera
Jean-Baptiste Lamarck